Donald Brookes McIlhenny (born November 22, 1934 in Cleveland, Ohio) is a former American football halfback in the National Football League for the Detroit Lions, Green Bay Packers, Dallas Cowboys, and San Francisco 49ers. He played college football at Southern Methodist University.

Early years
McIlhenny attended Hillsboro High School in Nashville. He accepted a football scholarship from Southern Methodist University. As a junior, he was third on the team with 62 carries for 316 yards (5.1-yard avg.). As a senior, he led the team with 104 carries for 544 yards (5.2-yard avg.).

He was a teammate of future Pro Football Hall of Famers Raymond Berry and Forrest Gregg.

Professional career

Detroit Lions
McIlhenny was selected in the third round (27th overall) of the 1956 NFL Draft by the Detroit Lions. As a rookie, he was the team's leading rusher during the first four games of the season, before injuries limited his productivity and finished with 372 rushing yards in 9 games.

On July 25, 1957, he was traded to the Green Bay Packers along with offensive tackles Ollie Spencer and Norm Masters, and offensive guard Jim Salsbury, in exchange for quarterback Tobin Rote and defensive back Val Joe Walker.

Green Bay Packers
The Green Bay Packers used him as a reserve halfback for 4 seasons. He led the team in rushing in 1957 with 100 carries for 384 yards and was fifth in the league in kickoff return average (25.9 yards).

Dallas Cowboys
McIlhenny was selected by the Dallas Cowboys in the 1960 NFL Expansion Draft, becoming the first starting halfback in franchise history. In the Cowboys 1960 inaugural season, he scored the first rushing touchdown for the Cowboys and was second on the team in rushing with 96 carries for 321 yards in 11 games (7 starts). He was waived on October 11, 1961.

San Francisco 49ers
He was claimed off waivers by the San Francisco 49ers and played in 5 games during the 1961 season.

Personal life
His son Lance McIlhenny played for Southern Methodist University and is the winningest quarterback in school and Southwest Conference history. His son Lott McIlhenny also played for Southern Methodist University. He has two daughters, Lynn McIlhenny Stocker and Lori McIlhenny.

References

1934 births
Living people
Players of American football from Houston
American football halfbacks
SMU Mustangs football players
Detroit Lions players
Green Bay Packers players
Dallas Cowboys players
San Francisco 49ers players